Las Minas de Baruta is one of 3 parishes in the Baruta Municipality and one of 32 of Caracas, Venezuela.

References

Parishes of Miranda (state)